Pakistanis are the citizens and nationals of the Islamic Republic of Pakistan. According to the 2017 Pakistani national census, the population of Pakistan stood at over 213 million people, making it the world's fifth-most populous country. The majority of Pakistanis natively speak languages belonging to the Indo-Iranic family (Indo-Aryan and Iranic subfamilies).

Located in South Asia, the country is also the source of a significantly large diaspora, most of whom reside in the Arab countries of the Persian Gulf, with an estimated population of 4.7 million. The second-largest Pakistani diaspora resides throughout both Northwestern Europe and Western Europe, where there are an estimated 2.4 million; over half of this figure reside in the United Kingdom (see British Pakistanis).

Ethnic subgroups 

Having one of the fastest-growing populations in the world, Pakistan's people belong to various ethnic groups, with the overwhelming majority being speakers of the Indo-Iranic languages. Ethnically, Indo-Aryan peoples comprise the majority of the population in the eastern provinces of Pakistani Punjab and Sindh while Iranic peoples comprise the majority in the western provinces of Balochistan and Khyber Pakhtunkhwa. In addition to its four provinces, Pakistan also administers two disputed territories known as Azad Jammu and Kashmir and Gilgit–Baltistan; both territories also have an Indo-Aryan majority with the exception of the latter's subregion of Baltistan, which is largely inhabited by Tibetan peoples. Pakistan also hosts a significant population of Dravidian peoples, the majority of whom are South Indians who trace their roots to historical princely states such as Hyderabad Deccan and are identified with the multi-ethnic community of Muhajirs, who arrived in the country after the partition of British India in 1947.

Major ethnolinguistic groups in the country include Punjabis, Pashtuns, Sindhis, Saraikis, and Baloch people; with significant numbers of Kashmiris, Brahuis, Hindkowans, Paharis, Shina people, Burusho people, Wakhis, Baltis, Chitralis, and other minorities.

Culture

The existence of Pakistan as an Islamic state since the 1956 constitution has led to the large-scale injection of Islam into most aspects of Pakistani culture and everyday life, which has accordingly impacted the historical values and traditions of the Muslim-majority population. Marriages and other major events are significantly impacted by regional differences in culture, but generally follow Islamic jurisprudence where required. The national dress of Pakistan is the shalwar kameez, a unisex garment widely-worn, and national dress, of Pakistan. When women wear the shalwar-kameez in some regions, they usually wear a long scarf or shawl called a dupatta around the head or neck. The dupatta is also employed as a form of modesty—although it is made of delicate material, it obscures the upper body's contours by passing over the shoulders. For Muslim women, the dupatta is a less stringent alternative to the chador or burqa.

Languages

Urdu, or Lashkari (لشکری ), an Indo-Aryan language, is the lingua franca of Pakistan, and while it shares official status with English, it is the preferred and dominant language used for inter-communication between different ethnic groups. Although Indo-Aryan in classification, it's exact origins as a language are disputed by scholars. However, despite serving as the country's national language, Urdu is spoken as a second language by most Pakistanis, with nearly 93 percent of the population speaking a first language other than Urdu. Numerous regional and provincial languages are spoken as native languages by Pakistan's various ethnolinguistic groups, with the Punjabi language having a national plurality as the first language of approximately 45 percent of the total population. Languages with more than a million speakers each include Pashto, Sindhi, Saraiki, Balochi, Brahui, and Hindko. The Pakistani dialect of English is also widely spoken throughout the country, albeit mostly in urban centres such as Islamabad and Karachi.

Religion

Pakistan officially endorses Islam as a state religion and utilizes Sharia in governance across the entire country to a large degree. The overwhelming majority of Pakistanis identify as Muslims, and the country has the second-largest population of Muslims in the world after Indonesia. Other minority religious faiths include Hinduism, Christianity, Ahmadiyya, Sikhism, the Baháʼí Faith, Zoroastrianism, and Kalasha. Pakistan's Hindu and Christian minorities comprise the second- and third-largest religious groups in the country, respectively.

Irreligion 
Irreligion, agnosticism, and atheism are present amongst a minority of Pakistanis, the majority of whom belong to the newer generations. According to a 2005 Gallup World Poll, 1 percent of Pakistani respondents identified themselves as atheists. By 2012, the figure had risen to 2 percent. The same poll also surveyed 2,700 other people in Pakistan, of whom 54 were self-declared irreligious.

Diaspora

The Pakistani diaspora maintains a significant presence in the Middle East, Europe, North America, and Australia. According to the United Nations Department of Economic and Social Affairs, Pakistan has the seventh-largest diaspora in the world. According to the Ministry of Overseas Pakistanis and Human Resource Development of the Government of Pakistan, approximately 8.8 million Pakistanis live abroad, with the vast majority (over 4.7 million) residing in the Arab states of the Persian Gulf.

See also

List of Pakistanis
Demographics of Pakistan
Ethnic groups in Pakistan
Overseas Pakistanis

Notes

References

Further reading
 Abbasi, Nadia Mushtaq. "The Pakistani diaspora in Europe and its impact on democracy building in Pakistan." International Institute for Democracy and Electoral Assistance (2010).
 Awan, Shehzadi Zamurrad. "Relevance of Education for Women's Empowerment in Punjab, Pakistan." Journal of International Women's Studies 18.1 (2016): 208+ online
 Bolognani, Marta, and Stephen Lyon, eds. Pakistan and its diaspora: multidisciplinary approaches (Springer, 2011).
 Eglar, Zekiya. A Punjabi Village in Pakistan: Perspectives on Community, Land, and Economy (Oxford UP, 2010).
 Kalra, Virinder S., ed. Pakistani Diasporas: Culture, conflict, and change (Oxford UP, 2009).
 Bano, Sha. "Role of museums in Depicting history of cultural heritage of Pakistan." (2019).
 Marsden, Magnus. "Muslim village intellectuals: the life of the mind in northern Pakistan." Anthropology today 21.1 (2005): 10-15.
 Mughal, M. A. Z. "An anthropological perspective on the mosque in Pakistan." Asian Anthropology 14.2 (2015): 166-181.
 Rauf, Abdur. "Rural women and the family: A study of a Punjabi village in Pakistan." Journal of Comparative Family Studies (1987): 403-415.

Origins of Pakistanis
 Vasil'ev, I. B., P. F. Kuznetsov, and A. P. Semenova. "Potapovo Burial Ground of the Indo-Iranic Tribes on the Volga" (1994).
 Ahsan, Aitzaz. The Indus Saga. Roli Books Private Limited, 2005.
 Mehdi, S. Q., et al. "The origins of Pakistani populations." Genomic Diversity. Springer, Boston, MA, 1999. 83-90.
 Balanovsky, Oleg, et al. "Deep phylogenetic analysis of haplogroup G1 provides estimates of SNP and STR mutation rates on the human Y-chromosome and reveals migrations of Iranic speakers." PLoS One 10.4 (2015): e0122968.
 Allchin, F. R. "Archeological and Language-Historical Evidence for the Movement of Indo-Aryan Speaking Peoples into South Asia." NARTAMONGÆ (1981): 65.
 Khan, F. A. "Archaeology in Pakistan." Expedition 6.3 (1964): 2.

 
Society of Pakistan